Cobb is an unincorporated community in Bryan County, Oklahoma, United States. It is located north of Durant on Oklahoma State Highway 78.

References

Unincorporated communities in Bryan County, Oklahoma
Unincorporated communities in Oklahoma